Baptiste is a commune in the Lascahobas Arrondissement, in the Centre department of Haiti. The town was made a commune by presidential decree on 22 July 2015 made it a commune.

References

Populated places in Centre (department)
Communes of Haiti